Tortured Conscience is a Christian extreme metal band from San Francisco, California.

History
Tortured Conscience formed in 2000 with the lineup of just two members, Jeff Lenormand on guitars and bass and Shannon Frye on drums and vocals. In 2001, the band released their first demo, titled Faces of God. The demo was re-released through The Collection Vol. 1: Tools of the Trade, a split release with Royal Anguish and Soul of the Savior in 2002.

In 2002, Sounds of the Dead (SOTD) Records, released A Brutal Christmas: The Season in Chaos, a compilation of Christmas songs covered by Christian metal bands. Tortured Conscience appeared on the compilation, alongside bands Kekal, Frost Like Ashes, Royal Anguish and Death Requisite, recording the song "The Little Drummer Boy". Tarantula Promotions released a sampler, titled Arachnid Terror Sampler for to promote some artists they had worked with, including Tortured Conscience, Soul Embraced, Frosthardr, and Sanctifica.

In 2006, the band released their debut album, Every Knee Shall Bow, via Bombworks Records. By this time, the lineup was Lenormand on guitars and bass, John Gotelli on drums and Berto Salas on vocals.

The band is currently working on new material with Lenormand on guitar, bass, and drum programming. The band stated that it will most likely be an EP and it will be released through Battlefrost Productions. In 2020, it was announced that their debut album was remixed and remastered and was to be re-released through Battlefrost Productions.

Christianity
The band is uncompromisingly Christian. In an interview, Lenormand stated; 

When asked about his ambitions for the band in another interview, he responded;

Members
Current
 Jeff Lenormand - Guitars/Bass (2000–present)

Former
 Berto Salas - Vocals (2004-2010)
 Paul Pontikoff - Vocals (2002)
 Shannon Frye - Drums/Vocals (2000-2002)
 John Gotelli - Drums (2002-2015)

Discography
Studio albums
Every Knee Shall Bow (2006; Bombworks)

Demos
Faces of God (2001)

Splits
The Collection Vol. 1: Tools of the Trade (2002; w/ Royal Anguish and Soul of the Savior)

Compilation appearances
A Brutal Christmas: The Season in Chaos (2002; SOTD)
Arachnid Terror Sampler (2002; Tarantula)
Christian Brutal Death Metal: Vol. 1 (2015)

References

American Christian metal musical groups
Death metal musical groups from California
Bombworks Records artists
Musical groups established in 2000
Musical groups from San Francisco